Ex-Voto de 1662 is a painting by the French artist Philippe de Champaigne now in the Louvre in Paris. One of Champaigne's most accomplished works, it is a votive offering (an ex-voto) by the painter which depicts a miracle involving his daughter that is said to have occurred at the Port-Royal-des-Champs Cistercian convent.

A ray of light illuminates Mother-Superior Agnès Arnauld, who experienced on the ninth day of her novena for Champaigne's daughter, Sister Catherine de Sainte Suzanne, the hope that a cure would come for Sister Catherine. Catherine (seated, praying) was the painter's only surviving child, and had been suffering from a paralyzing illness. Until that point, prayer and medical treatments ("potions, baths, unctions, and thirty bleedings") had proven futile. After the Mother-Superior's novena, Sister Catherine soon attempted to walk, and found herself increasingly mobile; the illness no longer seemed present. The painting is a statement of gratitude by the father for the cure of his daughter. The miracle it portrays also symbolized hope for the cause of the Jansenists, who were subject to persecution by ecclesiastical and civil authorities. The Jansenists followed Cornelius Jansen, who reasserted the theology of St. Augustine, and were in conflict with the Jesuits. Their refusal to sign a document condemning five propositions found in Jansen's Augustinus resulted in their being deprived of the sacraments and confined to the abbey, which was eventually torn down.

The composition is unique among Champaigne's work, with the two figures having richly defined, "sculptural" forms, lending them vitality and setting them off from the restricted hues and "angular simplicity" of the setting (Rand 1990). The figures dominate the canvas, giving the painting a monumental quality. The texture, weight, and folds of the robes are modeled in great detail, revealing Champaigne's Flemish training. His decision to portray the moment that Mother-Superior Agnès is instilled with hope, rather than the cure itself, is evident in the fact that the ray of light illuminates her instead of his daughter. The light develops a "chronological tension" that suggests "what will happen as a result of what is happening" (Rand 1983).

The painting includes a Latin inscription on the wall on the left of the painting. Neither the text nor the lettering were Champaigne's work.

The inscription, addressed to Christ, recounts that Sister Catherine suffered for 14 months from a high fever and that half her body was paralyzed; that she prayed with Mother Agnès and her health was restored, and again she offered herself to Christ; and that Champaigne offers the painting as a testament to this miracle and to express his joy.

References

Rand, Jr., Olan A. (1990). "Philippe de Champaigne" in James Vinson (ed.), International Dictionary of Art and Artists vol. 2, Art. Detroit: St. James Press; pp. 418–19. .

1662 paintings
Paintings by Philippe de Champaigne
Paintings in the Louvre by French artists
Jansenism
Votive offering